The Gleagle GS-CC is a 2-door convertible/coupe sports car concept revealed by Gleagle, a marque by Chinese automobile manufacturer Geely Auto, at the 2011 Auto Shanghai show.

Overview

The Gleagle GS-CC concepts were revealed at Auto Shanghai on April 21, 2011 in Shanghai, China, alongside 5 other concept cars. The two variants of the 2-door sports car concept are a coupe painted in orange and a convertible painted in red. Compared to similar coupe/convertible sports cars on sale at the time such as the Nissan 370Z, the GS-CC has a small 1.3L 4-cylinder engine, producing only 129 hp. The Gleagle GS-CC uses a 6-speed manual transmission.

Production model
At the 2011 Auto Shanghai show, Geely stated that the Gleagle GS-CC would go into production in 2014. However, this car was never produced.

References

Notes

Concept cars
Coupés